Chathinamkulam is a neighbourhood in the city of Kollam in the south west Indian state of Kerala. One of Kollam's 55 councils, it lies close to Chandanathoppe and is in fact one of the most beautiful neighborhoods in the state of Kerala. The postal code of the area is 691014.

References

Neighbourhoods in Kollam